The American Association Most Valuable Pitcher Award was an annual award given to the best pitcher in Minor League Baseball's American Association based on their regular-season performance. Though the league was established in 1902, the award was not created until 1969. From 1929 to 1962, pitchers were eligible to win the Most Valuable Player Award (MVP). Eight pitchers won the MVP Award before the league disbanded after the 1962 season. The Most Valuable Pitcher Award was first issued starting with the league's revival in 1969, and it continued to be awarded through 1996; no winner was selected in the 1997 season, after which the circuit disbanded again.

Five players from the Denver Bears, Indianapolis Indians, and Oklahoma City 89ers were each selected for the Most Valuable Pitcher Award, more than any other teams in the league, followed by the Buffalo Bisons (4); the Iowa Cubs, Nashville Sounds, and Omaha Royals (2); and the Evansville Triplets, Louisville Redbirds, and Tulsa Oilers (1).

Six players from the Montreal Expos Major League Baseball (MLB) organization won the award, more than any other, followed by the Chicago White Sox organization (5); the Philadelphia Phillies organization (3); the Cincinnati Reds, Cleveland Indians, Kansas City Royals, Pittsburgh Pirates, St. Louis Cardinals, and Texas Rangers organizations (2); and the Chicago Cubs and Milwaukee Brewers organizations (1).

Winners

Wins by team

Wins by organization

References
Specific

General

Pitcher
Awards established in 1969
Awards disestablished in 1996
Minor league baseball trophies and awards